Kincraig Lake Ecological Reserve (also known as Kooky Ponds and Kinell Pond) is a wildlife reserve located in Bispham in Blackpool on the Fylde coast, Lancashire, England. It is owned by Blackpool Council.

History
The site was originally a marl pit, excavated in the 1890s for fertiliser and surrounded by open farmland.

Kincraig Lake Ecological Reserve is one of fourteen Biological Heritage Sites (BHS) in Blackpool. A BHS provides a refuge for rare and threatened plants and animals.

Wildlife

There is a variety of wildlife seen at the reserve. In winter 2007 the local Fylde Bird Club organised a Christmas Bird Hunt around the Fylde and recorded the following birds at Kincraig Lake – grey heron, mallard, mute swan, Canada geese, shoveler, teal, mallard, coot, moorhen, sparrowhawk, little grebe, starling, magpie, long-tailed tit, snipe, grey wagtail, greylag geese, black-headed gull, goldcrest, blue tit, gadwall, tufted duck, great crested grebe and great spotted woodpecker.

Since then Fylde Bird Club have recorded additional birds at the lake including, great cormorant, European goldfinch, kingfisher and water rail

Friends of Kincraig Lake
In January 2008 a new "Friends of Kincraig Lake" group was set up by local residents to help restore the wetland back to its former glory, following years of tipping, vandalism and neglect. The group's first priority being to repair the footpaths which circumnavigate the entire lake at a cost of about £10,000, which would improve disabled access to the lake. The group's first meeting was held on 29 January at the local community centre in nearby Stronsay Place. As well making a priority improvements to the footpaths it was also agreed to beginning regular "litter picks", and to hold monthly Friends meetings. On 11 February it was revealed that Blackpool Probation Service has offered to send teams to clear out debris at two small ponds in the area, Kilmory Place pond and Dumfries Place pond. Also the priorities for the Friends include new footpaths, signs and repairs to benches with the main priority being to see the footpaths upgraded to improve access to, and around, the lake. On 12 April 2008 the Friends group organised a litter pick which was attended by local MP, Joan Humble and they removed nearly one tonne of litter and fly-tipping from around the lake. As part of the National Moth Night, the Friends organised a moth recording event for 7 June.

Ashfield pond and local area
There are a number of ponds of various sizes in the surrounding area including Ashfield pond, Dumfries Place pond and Kilmory Place pond as well as ponds on Robins Lane.

Ashfield pond, which is located to the north of Ashfield Road by Blackpool and The Fylde College Bispham campus. The Heritage Lottery Fund gave a grant of £22,800 to the Kincraig Pond Heritage Group and the Kincraig Neighbourhood Play Steering Group as part of a Community Heritage Project for the local area and Ashfield pond. The projects aim being to "restore the pond and surrounding area, research and record history of the local area, promote a greater awareness amongst local residents of the historical and environmental value of the local area." In 2006 the Kincraig Neighbourhood Play Steering Group received a £25,000 grant from the British Governments Living Spaces programme toward restoration work on Ashfield pond and the surrounding area as well as toward replanting to preserve the natural habitats for plants and animal species. Partly funded also by Blackpool Council and the local Residents Association, a new viewing platform was erected by Ashfield pond.

Dumfries Place pond iw part of an ecological area within  Kincraig Business Park which opened in summer 2008 and has an adjoining ecological area including the pond as well as  set aside purely for wildlife.

Gallery

See also
Bispham Rock Gardens
George Bancroft Park, Blackpool
Kingscote Park, Blackpool
Moor Park, Blackpool
Salisbury Woodland Gardens, Blackpool
Stanley Park, Blackpool

References

External links

Friends of Kincraig Lake
Blackpool Council website
Fylde Bird Club website

Geography of Blackpool
Parks and commons in Blackpool